The Wapiti River  is a river in eastern British Columbia and western Alberta, Canada. It is a major tributary of the Smoky River, located in the southern area of the Peace River Basin.

Wapiti is named after the Cree word for elk (waapiti).

Course

Wapiti River originates as the outflow of Tuck Lake, east of Wapiti Pass, in Wapiti Lake Provincial Park, east-central British Columbia, in the Canadian Rockies. It then runs in a north-eastern direction, crosses into Alberta, where it becomes more meandered as it continues through the County of Grande Prairie No. 1.

From west to east, Wapiti River flows through the alpine environment of the Rocky Mountains, the rolling foothills, then farmlands and aspen parkland in western Alberta. Wapiti Lake Provincial Park, Bear River Park, O'Brien Provincial Park and Pipestone Creek Park are protected areas along the river.

Tributaries and crossings

See also
List of British Columbia rivers
List of Alberta rivers

References

Rivers of Alberta
Rivers of British Columbia
Peace River Country
Rivers of the Canadian Rockies